Bille (also spelled Bilde) is a Danish noble family, part of the ancient Danish nobility. Its members have played a prominent role in Danish politics and society since the mid 13th century and also in Norway during the time Denmark was in a political union with Norway. The family includes the comital branches Bille-Brahe and Bille-Brahe-Selby. There was also a Norwegian branch of the family that died out in 1984.

In a 2021 episode of Who Do You Think You Are?, British actress Dame Judi Dench discovered that she is descended from the Bille family.

Notable members and descendants 

 Anders Bille (1600–1657)
 Beate Bille (b. 1976)
 Beate Clausdatter Bille (1526–1605)
 Daniel Ernst Bille (1711–1790)
 Ejler Bille (1910–2004)
 Eske Bille (d. 1552)
 Ida Marie Bille (1822–1902)
 Joen Bille (b. 1944)
 Louise Bille-Brahe (1830–1910)
 Michael Bille (1680–1756)
 Michael Johannes Petronius Bille (1769–1845)
 Ove Bille (d. 1555)
 Steen Andersen Bille (1797–1883)
 Steen Andersen Bille (1751–1833)

References 

 
Danish noble families
Norwegian noble families